Antonella Gambino (born 26 March 1990) is an Argentinian handball player. She plays for the club Argentinos Juniors and on the Argentina women's national handball team. She defended Argentina at the 2013 World Women's Handball Championship in Serbia, and the 2015 Pan American Games in Toronto (Canada), where Argentina won its inaugural qualification to the 2016 Rio Summer Olympics.

References

Argentine female handball players
1990 births
Living people
Argentine people of Italian descent
Pan American Games silver medalists for Argentina
Pan American Games medalists in handball
Handball players at the 2015 Pan American Games
Medalists at the 2015 Pan American Games
21st-century Argentine women